This is timeline of Mekelle, a city and capital of Tigray Region, Ethiopia.

History 

 13th century – Mekelle believed to be evolved from hamlet called Enda Meskel, later Medhane Alem, becoming a town by the early 19th century, when Ras Wolde Selassie of Enderta made Antalo his seat power.
 1882–84 – the grand palace of Yohannes IV was built by Tigrayan engineer Engedashet Kassa Sehul and forms the historic center of Mekelle.
 1871 – a church at Debre Gennet Medhane Alem, built after the return from Raya Azebo campaign.
 1880s – Mekelle became the capital of the Ethiopian Empire, and urbanized rapidly.
 1895–1896 – Mekelle was invited for conflict of the First Italo-Ethiopian War.
 October 1895 – the Italian army established their fort near the Enda Eyesus Church.
 January 1896 – the Italians surrendered; Menelik II allowed them to retreat their stronghold Adigrat.
 1920s and 1930s – Mekelle emerged as a major trade center.
 8 November 1935 – the Italians invaded Mekelle, contributed considerably to its modernization.
 1938 – two shops opened, two Italian restaurant and Hotel Amba Aradam with four rooms.
 May 1943 – Mekelle was the epicentre of Woyane rebellion against the weak Haile Selassie government. From September–October, the British conducted air bombardment caused heavy damage.
 1942–74 – the third phase urbanization took place.
 1942 – Mekelle municipality was founded.
 1962 – Master plan for Mekelle issued.
 1983–1985 – the 1983–1985 famine ravaged the city, causing 75,000 refugees with 20,000 more waiting to enter.
 February 1986 – The Tigray People's Liberation Front (TPLF) released 1,800 political prisoners from Mekelle prison during the military action against the Derg.
 25 February 1988 – series of offensives launched as TPLF fighters bypassed Mekelle but took control Maychew, Korem and another place along Dessie–Mekelle Road.
 June 1988 – The TPLF controlled Tigray except Mekelle.
 4 and 5 June 1988 – the Derg sacked villages around Mekelle, which included Addi Gera, Bahri, Goba Zena, Grarot, Issala and Rabea.
 25 February 1989 – Mekelle was occupied by TPLF, after the government position in Tigray collapsed.
 5 June 1998 – the Eritrean Air Force bombed Ayder School in Mekelle during the Eritrean–Ethiopian War killing twelve.
 29 December 2002 – a riot was occurred between Ethiopian Orthodox and Adventist followers as Adventist prayer service being conducted in a stadium.
 30 July 2008 – the United Nations Mission in Ethiopia and Eritrea (UNMEE) headquarters was established in Mekelle in 2000 and continued to the date.
 17–28 November 2020 – Mekelle offensive was took place by joint Ethiopian and Eritrean military forces during the Tigray War, including aerial bombardment.
 20 December 2020 – witnesses from Mekelle stated that artillery shelling had taken place before 28 November.
 28 June 2021, Mekelle was recaptured by Tigray Defense Force after evacuated by the federal government for several months.

References

Mekelle
Tigray Region